Lakes East is a census-designated place (CDP) in the town of Ridgefield, Fairfield County, Connecticut, United States. It is in the northeast part of the town and consists of neighborhoods sited around several small lakes, notably Wataba Lake in the north and Fox Hill Lake in the south.

Lakes East was first listed as a CDP prior to the 2020 census.

References 

Census-designated places in Fairfield County, Connecticut
Census-designated places in Connecticut